Pieter de Jong (c.1610 – after 1639), was a Dutch Golden Age member of the Haarlem schutterij.

Biography
He is only known from his portrait painted by Frans Hals in his schutterstuk called The Officers of the St George Militia Company in 1639. The portrait is possibly not of him but of someone called Mr. Johan van Wallenburg or "van Brienen". He is portrayed standing next to Hals himself as a sergeant of the white brigade, because he is wearing a white sash and holding a sergeant's halberd.

He is possibly the Pieter de Jong mentioned as the brother of the "former mayor Houff" in the archive document relating to the testament of Florens van der Houff, who is also portrayed in the same painting.

References

Pieter de Jong in De Haarlemse Schuttersstukken, by Jhr. Mr. C.C. van Valkenburg, pp. 71, Haerlem : jaarboek 1961, ISSN 0927-0728, on the website of the North Holland Archives
 Florens van der Houff in Collections of Paintings in Haarlem: 1572-1745, by Peter Biesboer (editor Carol Togneri), Getty Trust Publications, Los Angeles, 2003

1610s births
1640s deaths
Frans Hals
Painters from Haarlem